Hrudayi Preet Jagate is an Indian Marathi language television series directed by Mandar Devsthali under the banner of Swami Om Televisions airing on Zee Marathi. It stars Pooja Katurde and Siddharth Khirid in lead roles.

Cast

Main 
 Pooja Katurde as Veena Raghunath Abhyankar
 Siddharth Khirid as Prabhas Sadavarte

Recurring 
Prabhas' family
 Pournima Talwalkar as Shailaja Yogeshwar Sadavarte
 Vidyadhar Paranjape as Yogeshwar Sadavarte
 Raju Bawadekar as Shailesh Yogeshwar Sadavarte
 Deepali Chaugule as Yogini Shailesh Sadavarte
 Sachin Deshpande as Mihir Shailesh Sadavarte
 Manvita Joshi as Mihika Shailesh Sadavarte (Micky)

Veena's family
 Rajan Bhise as Raghunath Abhyankar
 Pankaj Vishnu as Manohar Jogalekar
 Deepa Jadhav as Rajani Manohar Jogalekar
 Trushna Chandratre as Urmila Manohar Jogalekar

Others
 Chinmayee Jogalekar as Chinmayee Kamerkar (Chika)
 Harshala Barade as Karishma (Cash)
 Dnyaneshwari Deshpande as Gojiri (Kha Kha)
 Sanchita Gupte as Sanchita (Ubha Dosa)
 Ranjit Patil as Pravin (Uncle)
 Ashish Joshi as Ajay
 Shilpa Kulkarni as Arundhati
 Eknath Gite as Kishor Rangade-Patil (Kishya)
 Vijay Sutar as Kishya's P.A.

Reception

Special episode (1 hour) 
 29 January 2023
 12 February 2023

Airing history

References

External links 
 Hrudayi Preet Jagate at ZEE5

Marathi-language television shows
2022 Indian television series debuts
Zee Marathi original programming